A Hahn Hi-Boy is a specialized, high-clearance type of farm crop chemical applicator designed to operate in high crops without damaging them.  The largest producer of hi-boys is Hagie Manufacturing Company of Clarion, Iowa, United States.  The most common uses of Hi-Boy are for detasseling, spraying herbicides, and applying glyphosate directly to weeds growing above crop height with a wick or wiper.

Agricultural machinery

The Hahn Hi-Boy was invented by Lloyd Hahn in Evansville in an undisclosed time in the 1940s